The Santa Cruz massacre (also known as the Dili massacre) was the murder of at least 250 East Timorese pro-independence demonstrators in the Santa Cruz cemetery in the capital, Dili, on 12 November 1991, during the Indonesian occupation of East Timor and is part of the East Timor genocide.

Background
In October 1991, a delegation to East Timor consisting of members of the Assembly of the Republic of Portugal and twelve journalists was planned during a visit from UN Special Rapporteur for Human Rights on Torture, Pieter Kooijmans. The Indonesian Government objected to the inclusion in the delegation of Jill Jolliffe, an Australian journalist who it regarded as supportive of the Fretilin independence movement, and Portugal subsequently cancelled the delegation. The cancellation demoralised independence activists in East Timor, who had hoped to use the visit to raise the international profile of their cause. Tension between Indonesian authorities and East Timorese youths rose in the days after Portugal's cancellation. On 28 October, Indonesian troops had located a group of resistance members in Dili's Motael Church. A confrontation ensued between pro-integration activists and those in the church; when it was over, one man on each side was dead. Sebastião Gomes, a supporter of independence for East Timor, was taken out of the church and shot by Indonesian troops, and integration activist Afonso Henriques was stabbed and killed during the fight.

Foreigners who had come to East Timor to observe the Portuguese delegation included independent US journalists Amy Goodman and Allan Nairn, and British cameraman Max Stahl. They attended a memorial service for Gomes on 12 November, during which several thousand men, women, and children walked from the Motael Church to the nearby Santa Cruz cemetery. Along the way, members of the group pulled out banners and East Timorese flags. Organizers of the protest maintained order during the protest; although it was loud, the crowd was peaceful and orderly, by most accounts. It was the largest and most visible demonstration against the Indonesian occupation since 1975.

The massacre
During a brief confrontation between Indonesian troops and protesters, some protesters and a major, Geerhan Lantara were stabbed.  Stahl claimed Lantara had attacked a group of protesters including a girl carrying the flag of East Timor, and FRETILIN activist Constâncio Pinto reported witness accounts of beatings from Indonesian soldiers and police. When the procession entered the cemetery some continued their protests before the cemetery wall. Around 200 more Indonesian soldiers arrived and advanced on the gathering, weapons drawn. In the graveyard, they opened fire on hundreds of unarmed civilians. At least 250 East Timorese were killed in the massacre. One of the dead was a New Zealander, Kamal Bamadhaj, a political science student and human rights activist based in Australia.

The massacre was witnessed by the two American journalists—Amy Goodman and Allan Nairn—and caught on videotape by Max Stahl, who was filming undercover for Yorkshire Television. As Stahl filmed the massacre, Goodman and Nairn tried to "serve as a shield for the Timorese" by standing between them and the Indonesian soldiers. The soldiers began beating Goodman, and when Nairn moved to protect her, they beat him with their weapons, fracturing his skull. The camera crew managed to smuggle the video footage to Australia. They gave it to Saskia Kouwenberg, a Dutch journalist, to prevent it being seized and confiscated by Australian authorities, who subjected the camera crew to a strip-search when they arrived in Darwin, having been tipped off by Indonesia. The video footage was used in the First Tuesday documentary In Cold Blood: The Massacre of East Timor, shown on ITV in the UK in January 1992, as well as numerous other, more recent documentaries. Stahl's footage, combined with the testimony of Nairn and Goodman and others, caused outrage around the world. The program In Cold Blood: The Massacre of East Timor was the overall winner at the inaugural Amnesty International UK Media Awards in 1992.

Indonesian authorities described the incident as a spontaneous reaction to violence from the protesters or a "misunderstanding". Objectors cited two factors: the documented history of mass violence committed by Indonesian troops in places such as Quelicai, Lacluta, and Kraras, and a series of statements from politicians and officers in Indonesia, justifying the military's violence. Try Sutrisno, Commander-in-Chief of the Indonesian forces, said two days after the massacre: "The army cannot be underestimated. Finally we had to shoot them. Delinquents like these agitators must be shot, and they will be."

Aftermath

In response to the massacre, activists around the world organised in solidarity with the East Timorese. Although a small network of individuals and groups had been working for human rights and self-determination in East Timor since the occupation began, their activity took on a new urgency after the 1991 massacre. TAPOL, a British organisation formed in 1973 to advocate for democracy in Indonesia, increased its work around East Timor. In the United States, the East Timor Action Network was founded and soon had chapters in ten cities around the country. Other solidarity groups appeared in Portugal, Australia, Japan, Germany, Malaysia, Ireland, and Brazil.

The television pictures of the massacre were shown worldwide, causing the Indonesian government considerable embarrassment. The coverage was a vivid example of how growth of new media in Indonesia was making it increasingly difficult for the "New Order" to control information flow in and out of Indonesia, and that in the post-Cold War 1990s, the government was coming under increasing international scrutiny. Copies of the Santa Cruz footage were distributed back into Indonesia allowing more Indonesians to see the actions of their government uncensored. A number of pro-democracy student groups and their magazines began to openly and critically discuss not just East Timor, but also the "New Order" and the broader history and future of Indonesia.

The US Congress voted to cut off funding for IMET training of Indonesian military personnel although arms sales continued from the US to the Indonesian National Armed Forces. President Clinton cut off all US military ties with the Indonesian military in 1999. By 2005, the US had resumed training and co-operation and by 2012 President Obama had increased military financial aid to US$1.56 Billion and approved the resumption of direct US military training of Indonesian special forces.

The massacre prompted the Portuguese government to increase its diplomatic campaign. Portugal unsuccessfully tried to apply pressure by raising the issue with its fellow European Union members in their dealings with Indonesia. However, other EU countries such as the UK had close economic relations with Indonesia, including arms sales, and were reluctant to jeopardise these.

In Australia, there was criticism of the federal government's recognition of Jakarta's sovereignty over East Timor. The government had been promoting increased ties with the Indonesian military at the time of the massacre, but in 1999 temporarily cut off military ties in response to the violence after that year's independence referendum. Australian foreign minister Gareth Evans, described the killings as "an aberration, not an act of state policy".

Commemorated as a public holiday in now independent East Timor, 12 November is remembered by the East Timorese as one of the bloodiest days in their history, one which drew worldwide attention to their fight for independence.

See also
 Biak Massacre
 History of East Timor
 List of massacres in East Timor
 Pro-Indonesia militia

Notes

References
 Carey, Peter. "Historical Background". Generations of Resistance. By Steve Cox. London: Cassell, 1995. . pp. 13–55.
 Comissão de Acolhimento, Verdade e Reconciliação de Timor Leste (CAVR). Chega! The Report of the Commission for Reception, Truth and Reconciliation. Dili, East Timor: 2005. Online at East Timor & Indonesia Action Network. Retrieved on 11 February 2008.
 Jardine, Matthew. East Timor: Genocide in Paradise. Monroe, ME: Odonian Press, 1999. .
 Krieger, Heike, ed. East Timor and the International Community: Basic Documents. Melbourne: Cambridge University Press, 1997. .
 Pinto, Constancio (1997). East Timor's Unfinished Struggle: Inside the Timorese Resistance. Boston: South End Press. .
 Vickers, Adrian (2005). A History of Modern Indonesia. Cambridge University Press. .

External links
 Massacre: The Story of East Timor 
 ETAN on the massacre
 IFET on the massacre
 Max Stahl Interview
 Video: Re-enactment of the Massacre on the Ninth Anniversary Santa Cruz Massacre 
East Timorese Journalist Marks 19th Anniversary of Santa Cruz Massacre – video report by Democracy Now!

Conflicts in 1991
Massacres in 1991
Indonesian occupation of East Timor
Massacres in Indonesia
1991 in East Timor
Protests
Protest-related deaths
November 1991 events in Asia
Dili